Tabara, Togo is a village in the Bassar Prefecture in the Kara Region  of north-western Togo.

the Region of Bassar is / Bandjeli testify for them the distant work of Iron in the region. Several old blast furnaces have been preserved (Nangbeni-Bassar).

References

Populated places in Kara Region
Bassar Prefecture